Days of Terror (Egyptian Arabic: أيام الرعب translit. Ayam Al-Ro'ab) is a 1988 Egyptian action-thriller film written by Gamal Al-Ghitani and directed by Said Marzouk. It stars Salah Zulfikar, Mahmoud Yassin and Mervat Amin.

Plot 
El Hag Abdel Rahim is a religious rich seller living in Al Hussain neighborhood who has one daughter, Salwa. She loves Mahrous, the son of migrant who escaped to Cairo 20 years ago for escaping from revenge, is working in an Egyptian Museum. When planning to get married he receives the news that Aweidah has been released from prison and is out to get revenge on him. Mahrous memories come flooding back and fear returns to his life turning him into a paranoid man. He quits his job and leaves the whole world around him to escape from his inevitable fate. Which means that Mahrous did not completely get rid of the old fear, but with this fear lurking inside all these years. In the end the solution is to confront fear and try to overcome it even if that is the end.

Crew 

 Story: Gamal Al-Ghitani
 Screenplay: Youssry El-Gindi
 Directed by: Said Marzouk
 Cinematography: Tarek El-Telmissany
 Production Studio: Arab International Art and Media production
 Distribution: El Nasr Films

Primary cast 

 Salah Zulfikar as (El-Hag Abdel Rahim)
 Mahmoud Yassin as (Mahroos)
 Mervat Amin as (Salwa)
 Ahmed Bedier as (Dardiri Al-Fran)
 Zahrat El-Ola as (Salwa’s mother, Aisha)
 Hayatem as (Fayqa)
 Ghassan Matar as (Awaida)
 Naima Al Sagheer as (Hajja Zahra)
 Ahmed Nabil Badour (Saad Al-Fran)
 Hassan Hussein Badour (owner of the popular bath)
 Mahmoud Farag

See also 

 Salah Zulfikar filmography
 List of Egyptian films of 1988
 List of Egyptian films of the 1980s

References

External links 

 
 Ayam Al-Ro'ab page on The Arabic Movies Database

Egyptian action films
Egyptian thriller films
1980s mystery films
1980s Arabic-language films
1988 films
Films shot in Egypt